Vallauris is a commune in the Alpes-Maritimes department in the Provence-Alpes-Côte d'Azur region in southeastern France. It is located in the metropolitan area,  and is today effectively an extension of the town of Antibes, bordering it on its west side. The seaside town Golfe-Juan is a part of the commune of Vallauris. Golfe-Juan-Vallauris station has rail connections to Grasse, Cannes, Antibes and Nice.

Picasso and Vallauris

In 1948 Picasso came to live in Vallauris, where he stayed until 1955. During his time in the town, he created a great many sculptures and paintings including his mural War and Peace, one of the major artworks of the period. He also developed a fascination for the techniques of ceramics and linocuts.

A freeman of the town, Picasso greatly contributed to the renaissance of the Vallauris pottery industry in the 1950s, this legendary golden age when everyone was a potter, including famous ceramicists Roger Capron and Charles Voltz. Many inhabitants still evoke his presence and that of his contemporaries (Françoise Gilot and her children Claude and Paloma, then Jacqueline Roque, his last partner whom he married amid the greatest secrecy at Vallauris town hall in 1961), the bullfights, exhibitions and visits by all kinds of famous people.

Population

Twin towns – sister cities

Vallauris is twinned with:
 Hódmezővásárhely, Hungary
 Lindenberg im Allgäu, Germany

See also
Communes of the Alpes-Maritimes department

References

External links

 Official website (in French)

Communes of Alpes-Maritimes
Alpes-Maritimes communes articles needing translation from French Wikipedia